Wade Township is one of fifteen townships in Clinton County, Illinois, USA.  As of the 2010 census, its population was 1,717 and it contained 713 housing units.  The township's name changed from Beaver Township on June 1, 1874.

Geography

Cities, towns, villages
 Beckemeyer
 Carlyle (west edge)

Unincorporated towns
 Royal Lake Resort
(This list is based on USGS data and may include former settlements.)

Cemeteries
The township contains these two cemeteries: Beckemeyer and Saint Anthony.

Demographics

School districts
 Carlyle Community Unit School District 1

Political districts
 Illinois' 19th congressional district
 State House District 102
 State Senate District 51

References
 
 United States Census Bureau 2007 TIGER/Line Shapefiles
 United States National Atlas

External links
 City-Data.com
 Illinois State Archives

Townships in Clinton County, Illinois
Townships in Illinois